Throughout this article, the unqualified use of the currency denomination "$" refers to play money in the context of the game.

BuyWord is a letter arrangement word game by American designer Sid Sackson. It is published by Face2Face Games.

Equipment
 108 letter tiles with varying numbers of pips under the letters.
 9 labelled "Wild" tiles with one pip.
 1 special six-sided die, with two faces labelled "choice" and other faces numbered 2 to 5.
 A supply of play money.
 A cloth bag.

Rules
The money is sorted into denominations and $200 are dealt to each player.  Players are issued a certain number of wild tiles each, depending on the number of players.  Letter tiles are placed in the bag.

On each game turn, each player performs the following operations:
 Buy (or discard) a set of letters from the bag.
 Sell any number of words (including none).
 Discard down to no more than eight tiles in hand.

Players take it in turn to act as leader. The leader rolls the die to determine how many tiles will be drawn from the bag by each player that round. If the die indicates "choice" the leader chooses any number from two to five tiles.

Having drawn tiles from the bag, players in turn decide to either purchase or discard those tiles. The cost of a set of tiles is equal to the square of the number of pips showing in the set. Tiles must be purchased or discarded as a set; players may not purchase some of the drawn tiles and not others. Discarded tiles are removed from the game. Purchased tiles are taken into the buyer's hand.

After a round of tile purchases, players may sell words formed from tiles in their hands. A word may include a single wild tile, which can represent any letter.  The sale price of a word is determined exactly as is the purchase price of a set of letters: as the square of the pips showing in the word.  The validity of words is judged based on any standard mutually agreed to by the players ahead of time.

After all players have had the opportunity to sell words, no player may hold more than eight letter tiles in hand. Wild tiles do not count against this limit. Players must either sell words or discard tiles to adhere to this limit.  Once this is done, the role of leader passes to the next player and a new round of play begins.

The game ends when players find that there are insufficient letter tiles in the bag to conduct tile purchases for the round in progress. All remaining tiles in the bag are discarded, and the round is completed without the tile buying phase.

The player with the most money at the end of the game is the winner. In the one-player game, the player simply judges his performance based on his winnings; $800-$1000 is suggested as a range to measure against.

Variants
The game rules include several suggested variants, such as auctions and trades of tiles or cash, themes to be required of all words sold, and building new words in crossword fashion.

Awards
BuyWord was the GAMES 100 Game of the Year in 2004.

References
 Sackson, Sid and Martin, W. Eric (ed). BuyWord game instructions, 2005.

External links
 

Sid Sackson games
Word games